Ma (Ma Wam), or Mebu, is one of the Finisterre languages of Papua New Guinea. It is spoken in Mibu and Tariknan villages of Rai Coast Rural LLG, Madang Province.

References

Finisterre languages
Languages of Morobe Province